Phyllonorycter styracis is a moth of the family Gracillariidae. It is known from Kyūshū, Japan.

The wingspan is 7–8 mm.

The larvae feed on Styrax japonicus. They mine the leaves of their host plant. The mine has the form of a ptychonomous mine on the upperside of the leaf.

References

styracis
Moths of Japan
Moths described in 1963